The Taiwan saddled carpetshark (Cirrhoscyllium formosanum) is a carpetshark of the family Parascylliidae found around Taiwan, between latitudes 28°N and 21°N, at depths to 110 m.  Its length is up to 39 cm.

Reproduction is oviparous.

References

 
 Compagno, Dando, & Fowler, Shark Life Magazine Sharks of the World, Princeton University Press, New Jersey 2005 

Taiwan saddled carpetshark
Fish of Taiwan
Taiwan saddled carpetshark